is a passenger railway station located in Kanagawa-ku, Yokohama, Kanagawa Prefecture, Japan, operated by the private railway company Tokyu Corporation.

Lines

Station layout 
The station consists of two elevated opposed side-platforms, with the station building underneath. These platforms can only accommodate eight-car train lengths.

Platforms

History
Hakuraku Station was opened on February 14, 1926. The station building was remodeled in 2006.

Passenger statistics
In fiscal 2019, the station was used by an average of 44,323 passengers daily. 

The passenger figures for previous years are as shown below.

Surrounding area
 Kanagawa University Yokohama Campus 
 Hakuraku Shopping Street
 Rokukakubashi Shopping Street 
 Kanagawa Prefectural Police Traffic Safety Center
 Seishin Girls' High School

See also
 List of railway stations in Japan

References

External links

 

Railway stations in Kanagawa Prefecture
Railway stations in Japan opened in 1926
Tokyu Toyoko Line
Stations of Tokyu Corporation
Railway stations in Yokohama